Michael Duane Miller (born December 29, 1959) is a retired track and field sprinter and American football wide receiver. Representing the United States, he is best known for setting the 1982 world's best year performance in the men's 200 metres. He did so at altitude on June 2, 1982 at a meet in Provo, Utah, clocking 20.15. Miller was an All-American track athlete at the University of Tennessee.

Football

Miller was drafted by the Green Bay Packers in the 4th round (104th overall) of the 1983 NFL Draft. He played for the New York Giants (1983) and the New Orleans Saints (1985).

References

External links
 1982 Year Rankings

1959 births
Living people
American football wide receivers
American male sprinters
New Orleans Saints players
New York Giants players
Players of American football from Michigan
Sportspeople from Flint, Michigan
Tennessee Volunteers football players